Rita de Cássia Bove (born 8 June 1990) is a Brazilian footballer who plays as a midfielder for Cruzeiro.

International career
Rita Bove made her full international debut for the Brazil women's national team on 4 July 2017, coming on as a late substitute for Francielle in a 1–3 loss against Germany.

Career statistics

International

Honours
São José
Copa Libertadores Femenina: 2014
Campeonato Paulista de Futebol Feminino: 2014, 2015

Santos
Copa Paulista: 2020

References

1990 births
Living people
Footballers from São Paulo (state)
Brazilian women's footballers
Women's association football midfielders
Saad Esporte Clube (women) players
São José Esporte Clube (women) players
Santos FC (women) players
Brazil women's international footballers
Campeonato Brasileiro de Futebol Feminino Série A1 players